Dirty Creek is a stream in Johnson County, Arkansas, in the United States. It is a tributary of Horsehead Creek.

"Dirty" is a corruption of Dardenne or Derden, the name of a French family of pioneer settlers.

See also
List of rivers of Arkansas

References

Rivers of Johnson County, Arkansas
Rivers of Arkansas